Jimmy Donaldson (born May 7, 1998), better known as MrBeast, is an American YouTuber and philanthropist. He is credited with pioneering a genre of YouTube videos that centers on expensive stunts. His YouTube channel reached 137 million subscribers in March 2023, making it the fourth-most-subscribed on the platform.

Donaldson began posting videos to YouTube in early 2012 at the age of 13 under the handle MrBeast6000; his early content ranged from Let's Plays to "videos estimating the wealth of other YouTubers." He went viral in 2017 after his "counting to 100,000" video earned tens of thousands of views in just a few days, and he has become increasingly popular ever since, with most of his videos gaining tens of millions of views. Over time, his style of content diversified to include challenge and donation videos that reward thousands of dollars, videos with arduous tasks or survival challenges, and original vlogs. Once his channel took off, Donaldson hired several of his childhood friends to help him run the growing brand. As of 2022, the MrBeast team is made up of 30 people, including Donaldson himself.

Other than MrBeast, Donaldson runs the YouTube channels Beast Reacts, MrBeast Gaming, MrBeast 2 (formerly MrBeast Shorts), and the philanthropy channel Beast Philanthropy. He formerly ran MrBeast 3 (initially MrBeast 2), which is now inactive. He was also one of the 10 highest-paid YouTubers of 2020. Donaldson is also the founder of MrBeast Burger and Feastables, and a co-creator of Team Trees, a fundraiser for the Arbor Day Foundation that has raised over $23 million, and Team Seas, a fundraiser for Ocean Conservancy and The Ocean Cleanup that has raised over $30 million. Donaldson won the Creator of the Year award three times at the Streamy Awards in 2020, 2021, and 2022; he also won the Favorite Male Creator award twice at the Nickelodeon Kids' Choice Awards in 2022 and 2023.

Early life and family 
Jimmy Donaldson was born on May 7, 1998, in Wichita, Kansas. He was mainly raised alongside his older brother Charles "C.J." Donaldson in Greenville, North Carolina. In 2016, Donaldson graduated from Greenville Christian Academy, a private high school in the area. Donaldson has publicly mentioned being diagnosed with Crohn's disease during high school. He briefly attended East Carolina University before dropping out. Donaldson's brother is also a YouTuber, who goes by CjTheseDays (Formerly called MrBro), and has more than 4.35 million subscribers as of March 2023.

YouTube career

Early viral attempts (2012–2017) 

Donaldson uploaded his first YouTube video in February 2012, at the age of 13, under the handle "MrBeast6000"; his early content ranged from Let's Plays (mainly focused on Minecraft and Call of Duty: Black Ops II), videos estimating the wealth of other YouTubers, videos that offered tips to upcoming YouTube creators, and commentary on YouTube drama. Donaldson appeared only infrequently in these videos. In July 2013, the subscriber count of his channel, then named "That-dude", was around 240.

In 2015 and 2016, Donaldson began to gain popularity with his "Worst intros on YouTube" series poking fun at YouTube video introductions. By mid-2016, Donaldson had around 30,000 subscribers. In fall 2016, Donaldson dropped out of East Carolina University to pursue a full-time career as a YouTuber. His mother did not approve of this and made him move out of the family home.

As his channel grew, Donaldson hired four childhood friends – Chris Tyson, Chandler Hallow, Garrett Ronalds, and Jake Franklin – to contribute to his channel. They then contacted numerous YouTubers in order to obtain statistics of their successful videos and predicting the platform's recommendation system. Franklin left the crew in 2020; afterwards, Karl Jacobs, previously a cameraman, was promoted to take his place.

Rise to fame (2017–2020) 

In January 2017, Donaldson published an almost day-long video of himself counting to 100,000. The ordeal took him 40 hours, with some parts sped up to "keep it under 24 hours." Donaldson also gained popularity during this period with stunts, such as attempting to break glass using a hundred megaphones, watching paint dry for an hour, attempting to stay underwater for 24 hours (which ended up failing due to health issues), and an unsuccessful attempt to spin a fidget spinner for a day. By 2018, Donaldson had given out $1 million through his outlandish stunts, which earned him the title of "YouTube's biggest philanthropist."

During the PewDiePie vs T-Series rivalry in 2018, a competition to become the most-subscribed channel on YouTube, Donaldson bought billboards and numerous television and radio advertisements to help PewDiePie gain more subscribers than T-Series. During Super Bowl LIII, he bought multiple seats for himself and his team, whose shirts spelled out "Sub 2 PewDiePie."

In March 2019, Donaldson organized and filmed a real-life battle royale competition in Los Angeles with a prize of $200,000 (two games were played, making game earnings of $100,000 for each game) in collaboration with Apex Legends. The event and prize pool was sponsored by Apex Legends publisher Electronic Arts.

Donaldson was accused of using counterfeit money in his video titled "I Opened A FREE BANK", published on November 23, 2019. He later explained that he used fake money to avoid participant safety concerns and that participants received real checks after the shoot.

In April 2020, Donaldson created a rock, paper, scissors competition stream that featured 32 influencers and a grand prize of $250,000, which at the time became YouTube's most-watched live Original event with 662,000 concurrent viewers. The event was ultimately won by Nadeshot. In October 2020, Donaldson hosted another influencer tournament featuring 24 competitors with a grand prize of $300,000. The tournament was ultimately won by the D'Amelio family, which caused controversy due to claims that they cheated.

Career (2021–present) 
On January 1, 2021, Donaldson released the video "Youtube Rewind 2020, Thank God It's Over". In Donaldson's video, he explains that he had always believed that YouTubers "should get more say in Rewind," and with this in mind, he decided to call "hundreds of YouTubers." At the end of the video, Donaldson gives a shoutout to PewDiePie, citing him and his 2018 Rewind as the inspiration for Donaldson's Rewind. A month later, Donaldson signed a Facebook and Snapchat content distribution deal with Jellysmack.

In November 2021, Donaldson uploaded a recreation of the survival drama streaming television series Squid Game in real life, in which 456 people competed for a $456,000 cash prize, without the violence in the show. The video has more than 325 million views as of December 24, 2022, making it Donaldson's most-viewed YouTube video and also making it one of the most-watched YouTube videos of 2021. A review of the video in Vice stated that it "badly misunderstood the anti-capitalist message of Squid Game".

In December 2021, Donaldson created a third influencer tournament featuring 15 competitors with a grand prize of $1,000,000. In January 2022, Forbes ranked MrBeast as YouTube's highest-earning creator, earning an estimated $54 million in 2021. Forbes also stated that his income in 2021 would have placed him 40th in the 2020 Forbes Celebrity 100, earning as much money as Vin Diesel and Lewis Hamilton did in 2020.

On July 28, 2022, Donaldson surpassed 100 million subscribers on his main channel, making him the fifth channel and the second individual YouTuber to achieve the milestone. On November 17, 2022, Donaldson achieved the Guinness World Record of "Most Subscribers for an Individual Male on YouTube" with his MrBeast channel at 112,193,139 subscribers.

In December 2022, two MrBeast outfits and other cosmetic items were added to Fortnite Battle Royale. Epic Games also held a tournament in Fortnite called "MrBeast's Extreme Survival Challenge", which had a payout prize of one million dollars.

In February 2023, he appeared in a viral commercial for the NFL which aired during Super Bowl LVII.

Business model 
Donaldson's videos are known to contain certain elements in order to go viral. By doing so, he gains advertising sales of "tens of millions of dollars", as social media's recommendation systems show his videos to more people. Accordingly, per The Detroit News, his videos have elements of internet challenges, guest appearances, and reaction videos – three popular video genres online. On YouTube, his videos make use of catchy clickbait titles such as "I Adopted EVERY Dog in a Dog Shelter", explain the challenges in under half a minute, and keep their length between ten and twenty minutes.

According to Donaldson, large monetary prizes are also an important factor in viewer engagement. Therefore, his videos often involve him donating large amounts of money to individuals, with many of these videos being sponsored by various companies through large-scale brand deals that appear as advertisements within his videos. He also sometimes hosts competitions in video games, such as Minecraft, for large prizes, including donating a house in one of his gaming videos. MrBeast has been credited with launching a new style of high-cost stunt videos on YouTube, where creators pull off elaborate challenges and large-scale sponsored giveaways. Donaldson claimed in January 2021 that he runs his main channel at a loss.

Psychologist Tim Kasser claimed that a MrBeast video promoting a product would be about half as expensive as running a television ad, with higher engagement and reception.

Other ventures

Finger on the App 
In June 2020, Donaldson, in collaboration with Brooklyn-based art collective MSCHF, released a one-time multiplayer mobile game titled "Finger on the App". In the game, players touch their phone screen and the last person to remove their finger from the screen wins $25,000. In the end, four people ended up winning $20,000 each after keeping their finger on the app for over 70 hours. The game was reportedly so successful that a sequel titled "Finger on the App 2" was planned to originally launch in December 2020. However, the game was postponed to February and then further delayed to March 2021 due to a flood of downloads, causing the game to crash and requiring the game's developers to upgrade their servers. This time, the game featured a grand prize of $100,000. The winner kept their finger on the phone screen for around 51 hours; the second-place finisher also received a prize of $20,000.

MrBeast Burger 

Will Hyde, a producer for the MrBeast channel, announced in a November 2020 article with The Wake Weekly that Donaldson would launch a virtual restaurant called MrBeast Burger in December 2020. Hyde said his team worked with Virtual Dining Concepts during the development of the restaurant concept. He said that MrBeast Burger will sell franchise rights to serve the burgers to restaurants across the US and customers will be able to order the burgers via online delivery services. Then in August 2022, Donaldson announced that he would bring a MrBeast Burger shop to the American Dream Mall in East Rutherford, New Jersey, near New York City, to be the location of his first U.S. restaurant. The restaurant opened on September 4, 2022.

Feastables 

In January 2022, Donaldson announced the creation of a new food company called Feastables, which launched with its own brand of chocolate bars called "MrBeast Bars." At launch they offered 3 flavors of bars, original, almond and quinoa crunch. The launch corresponded with a sweepstakes with over $1 million in prizes, including 10 grand prize winners who would receive a chance to compete for a chocolate factory in a future video. The video was released in June 2022, which featured Gordon Ramsay as a cake judge and a $500,000 cash prize. The video contained a series of elimination challenges where the winner won the chocolate factory. The video contained cameos from competitive eaters Matt Stonie & Joey Chestnut. On February 2, 2022, Feastables announced partnerships with Turtle Beach Corporation and Roccat to provide prizes for the sweepstakes. Feastables reportedly made $10 million in its first few months of operation.

Investments and partnerships 
Donaldson is an investor in the tech startup Backbone, which produces the Backbone One, a controller that makes smartphones appear more similar to Nintendo Switch controllers, and the Backbone app, a content creation and social tools app for its users.

In March 2021, Donaldson partnered with Creative Juice financial network to introduce Juice Funds, a $2 million investment fund for content creators.

In April 2021, Donaldson became a long-term investor and partner of financial technology company Current. The same month, Donaldson received backlash after fans lost large amounts of money in a cryptocurrency scheme that Donaldson had invested in and promoted.

Philanthropy

Team Trees 

On October 25, 2019, Donaldson and former NASA engineer and YouTuber Mark Rober announced a collaborative fundraising challenge event on YouTube called #TeamTrees. The goal of this project was to raise $20 million for the Arbor Day Foundation by January 1, 2020, and plant trees "no later than December 2022." Every donation goes to the Arbor Day Foundation, which pledges to plant one tree for every dollar donated. Notable YouTubers such as Rhett & Link, Marshmello, iJustine, Marques Brownlee, The Slow Mo Guys, Ninja, Simone Giertz, Jacksepticeye, and Smarter Every Day brought attention to the project, and trees began to be planted in October 2019 in US national parks. On December 19 of that year, the $20,000,000 goal was surpassed. The project has received large donations from corporate executives Jack Dorsey, Susan Wojcicki, Elon Musk, and Tobias Lütke., as well as from companies such as Discovery, Verizon and Plants vs. Zombies. Tobias Lütke, founder and CEO of Shopify, holds the record for the highest donation at 1,000,001 trees planted. As of February 11, 2023, the original goal of 20 million trees has been far surpassed, with over 24.3 million trees in the ground.

Beast Philanthropy 
On September 17, 2020, the YouTube channel Beast Philanthropy was created. On the channel's first video, Donaldson announced the charity and food bank and named Darren, who had appeared in previous videos, as executive director. According to the channel description, 100% of its advertising revenue, brand deals, and merchandise sales are donated to charity.

Team Seas 

On October 29, 2021, Donaldson and Rober organized another collaborative challenge event on YouTube titled #TeamSeas. The goal of this project was to raise $30 million for the Ocean Conservancy and The Ocean Cleanup by January 1, 2022. The $30 million goal would fund the removal of 30 million pounds of plastic and other waste from oceans, rivers, and beaches. Donaldson and Rober enlisted thousands of content creators, including AzzyLand, DanTDM, TommyInnit, LinusTechTips, TierZoo, LEMMiNO, The Infographics Show, Hannah Stocking, Dhar Mann and Marques Brownlee, and partnered with BEN and TubeBuddy's initiative of 8 million global creators, to promote the fundraiser.

Cataract surgery 
In January 2023, Donaldson paid for cataract surgery for a thousand people who had severely limited vision and had been unable to afford the procedure. Responses to his video on the subject ranged from praise at its intention to spread awareness to criticism that he was motivated solely by profit. Other comments criticized the American medical system for failing to provide the necessary healthcare to the patients in the video, questioning why patients had to rely on a YouTuber for the procedure.

Public image 

Opinion polls have shown that Donaldson is one of the most well-liked YouTubers on the platform. A 2021 SurveyMonkey poll showed that 70% of respondents have a favorable view of him, compared to 12% who had an unfavorable view.

During a Clubhouse room in February 2021, Donaldson booted entrepreneur Farokh Sarmad after he said he could not pronounce his name, a move that Sarmad later said was racist. Sarmad's claims were questioned and denied by other Clubhouse users who were present at the call who argued against Sarmad's claims, claiming that MrBeast removed him along with others to make room for women on the stage to be more inclusive.

In a May 2021 New York Times article, Matt Turner, an editor for Donaldson from February 2018 to September 2019, claimed that Donaldson berated him almost daily, including calling him a retard. Turner also reported that he was regularly not credited for his work. Reporting by Insider showed that Turner previously posted a video in 2018 explaining his allegations, and in October 2019 released a deleted Twitter thread which stated that he was "yelled at, bullied, called mentally retarded and replaceable by MrBeast every single day."

Nate Anderson quit after working for Donaldson for a week in 2018 over what he said were unreasonable demands and called Donaldson a perfectionist. After releasing a video describing his experience, Anderson reportedly received death threats from MrBeast's fans. Nine other employees who worked for Donaldson also stated that while Donaldson was sometimes generous, his demeanour would change when cameras were off. They described a difficult work environment while working under him.

Awards and nominations

Notes

References

External links
 
 
 

1998 births
20th-century American people
21st-century philanthropists
American YouTubers
Businesspeople from Kansas
Charity fundraisers (people)
English-language YouTube channels
Gaming YouTubers
Gaming-related YouTube channels
Internet memes introduced in 2017
Living people
Maker Studios people
People from Greenville, North Carolina
Philanthropists from North Carolina
Shorty Award winners
Streamy Award winners
YouTube channels launched in 2012
People from Wichita, Kansas